Mouhamadou Habibou "Habib" Diallo (born 18 June 1995) is a Senegalese professional footballer who plays as a forward for Ligue 1 club Strasbourg and the Senegal national team.

Club career

Metz
In the summer of 2015, Diallo was promoted to the senior team at Metz. He played 17 games in his debut season with the club, scoring 9 times. He appeared in 19 matches for Metz during the 2016–17 Ligue 1 season, scoring once. In January 2017, he was sent out on loan to Brest for the remainder of the season after falling out of favour with new manager Frédéric Hantz. Diallo had a successful time in Brittany, playing 16 times and scoring 7 goals. He went back on loan to Brest in the summer 2017 under the management of Jean-Marc Furlan. He spent the entire season there as Brest finished 5th and he scored 9 goals in 33 games in Ligue 2.

After returning from his loan, Diallo had a prolific season with Metz, winning the Ligue 2 title and scoring 26 league goals in 37 games in the process, only bettered by Gaëtan Charbonnier who played for Diallo's old club Brest, scoring 27 times. Diallo was included in the year-end UNFP Ligue 2 Team of the Season squad alongside 6 of his Metz teammates.

Diallo immediately got up to life in Ligue 1, scoring 6 times in his first 8 matches. In the January window he was subject to interest and a reported bid from Premier League club Chelsea, but no move materialised. By the time the Ligue 1 was suspended in March 2020 due to the coronavirus pandemic, Diallo had contributed 12 goals with Metz sitting in 15th position in the table.

Strasbourg 
On 5 October 2020, Diallo joined Strasbourg on a five-year contract.

International career
Diallo made his debut for Senegal on 17 November 2018 in an Africa Cup of Nations qualifier against Equatorial Guinea, as a 55th-minute substitute for M'Baye Niang.

Career statistics

Club

International
Scores and results list Senegal's goal tally first.

Honours
Metz

 Ligue 2: 2018–19

Senegal
Africa Cup of Nations: 2021

Individual
UNFP Ligue 2 Team of the Season: 2018–19
UNFP Ligue 2 Player of the Month: August 2018

References

External links
 
 

Living people
1995 births
Sportspeople from Thiès
Senegalese footballers
Senegal international footballers
Association football forwards
FC Metz players
Stade Brestois 29 players
RC Strasbourg Alsace players
Ligue 1 players
Ligue 2 players
Championnat National players
Championnat National 2 players
2015 Africa U-23 Cup of Nations players
2021 Africa Cup of Nations players
Africa Cup of Nations-winning players
Senegalese expatriate footballers
Senegalese expatriate sportspeople in France
Expatriate footballers in France